The John C. Stennis Lock and Dam, formerly named Columbus Lock and Dam, is one of four lock and dam structures on the Tennessee-Tombigbee Waterway that generally lie along the original course of the Tombigbee River. It is located near Columbus, Mississippi, and impounds Columbus Lake. It is named for longtime U.S. Senator from Mississippi, John C. Stennis.

References

External links
Tennessee-Tombigbee Waterway (U.S. Army Corps of Engineers)
Tennessee-Tombigbee Waterway – Pictures and stories

Dams in Mississippi
Buildings and structures in Lowndes County, Mississippi
Tennessee–Tombigbee Waterway
Crossings of the Tombigbee River